was a daimyō during early-Edo period Japan. He was the second head of the Ogyū-Matsudaira clan.

Biography
Matsudaira Norinaga was the eldest son of Matsudaira Ienori, a Sengoku period samurai and daimyō of Iwamura Domain in Mino Province under the early Tokugawa shogunate. On the death of his father in 1614, he was confirmed as head of the Ogyū-Matsdaira clan and the same year accompanied  the forces of Shōgun Tokugawa Hidetada at the Siege of Osaka. In 1634, he was transferred to Hamamatsu Domain in Tōtōmi Province with an increase in revenues from 20,000 to 36,000 koku.

In 1642, Matsudaira Norinaga was promoted to the post of Rōjū under Shōgun Tokugawa Iemitsu. From 1644, he was transferred to Tatebayashi Domain in Kōzuke Province with an increase in revenues to 60,000 koku, where he ruled to his death in 1654.

Matsudaira Norinaga was married to the daughter of Mizuno Tadayoshi, daimyō of Yoshida Domain in Mikawa Province.

References 
 Papinot, Edmund. (1906) Dictionnaire d'histoire et de géographie du japon. Tokyo: Librarie Sansaisha...Click link for digitized 1906 Nobiliaire du japon (2003)
 The content of much of this article was derived from that of the corresponding article on Japanese Wikipedia.

|-

|-

Fudai daimyo
Ogyū-Matsudaira clan
Rōjū
1600 births
1654 deaths